Stygobromus heteropodus, commonly called Pickle Springs amphipod, is a phreatobite species of amphipod in family Crangonyctidae. It is endemic to Ste. Genevieve County, Missouri in the United States.

References

Freshwater crustaceans of North America
Crustaceans described in 1943
heteropodus
Endemic fauna of Missouri